"More Girls Like You" is a song co-written and recorded by American country music artist Kip Moore, released digitally on February 10, 2017, and to radio on February 21, 2017. It serves as the lead single to his third studio album Slowheart.  The song was written by Moore, Steven Lee Olsen, Josh Miller and David Garcia.

Content
Rolling Stone described the song by saying, "Saddling romance and a bit of faith to an easy gallop of a rhythm, Kip Moore sings of domestic bliss." The song is about a man praising a woman with a "settling presence."

Commercial performance
"More Girls Like You" peaked at number four on the Billboard Country Airplay chart for the week ending October 27, 2017, making it Moore's fourth top ten single and his first since "Hey Pretty Girl", in 2013. The song has sold 122,000 copies in the United States as of October 2017.

Charts

Year-end charts

Certifications

References

2017 songs
2017 singles
Kip Moore songs
MCA Nashville Records singles
Songs written by Kip Moore
Songs written by Steven Lee Olsen
Songs written by David Garcia (musician)